Athanu is a 2001 Telugu-language film directed by Sathyam Babu under the Savera Creations banner. It stars Sai Kumar and Rachana in the lead roles amongst others.

Cast

Sai Kumar
Rachana
P.J. Sharma

Kallu Chidambaram
Ravi Varma
Brahmanandam
Kovai Sarala
L.B. Sriram

Music

The soundtrack composed by Chakri consists of 5 songs.

1."Navvindante"

2."Love Song Padave"

3."Paraahushar"

4."Vav Andham"

5."Maa Kem Takkuva"

Reception 
A critic from Full Hyderabad wrote that "Badly made, with an inapt script, this flick should be given as wide a berth as possible".

References

2001 films
2000s Telugu-language films